The 1988–89 Serie C2 was the eleventh edition of Serie C2, the fourth highest league in the Italian football league system.

A total of 72 teams contested the league, divided into four groups (in Italian: Gironi) of 18 teams.

League tables

Girone A

Girone B

Relegation play-offs

Girone C

Promotion play-offs

Girone D

References

External links
Italy Championship 1988/89 at RSSSF

Serie C2 seasons
Italy
4